The McElroy Octagon House, also known as the Colonial Dames Octagon House, is a historic octagonal house now located at 2645 Gough Street at Union Street in the Cow Hollow neighborhood of San Francisco, California.

It is listed as a San Francisco Designated Landmark since February 3, 1969; listed as a California Historical Landmark since February 23, 1972; and has been added to the National Register of Historic Places since February 23, 1972.

The house is open to the public for tours, see signage.

History 
William C. McElroy (?–1869) and his spouse Harriet Shober (1816–1899) bought the lot across the street from the house's current location on Gough Street in 1859. McElroy was a wood miller by trade and he built the house between 1860 and 1861. Originally the house was designed with two floors (four rooms on each floor) with a winding staircase in the middle of the building. The McElroy family lived in the house until around the 1880s when the house became a rental property. Daniel O’Connell, a co-founder of the Bohemian Club, was one of the rental tenants. In April 1906 the house was badly damaged during the 1906 Earthquake. By 1909 the house was no longer owned by the McElroy family and it changed ownership many times.

The house was vacant and neglected in 1951 when the National Society of the Colonial Dames of America in California bought it, moved it across the street and began its restoration. The house was restored by University of California, Berkeley's former Dean of Architecture, Warren C. Perry. During the restoration, the original layout of the house was changed so it would be more functional as an event space. By 1953 the building opened as a museum.

The original location of the house (across the street) contains condominiums that were built on the property in 1955.

McElroy Octagon House, Feusier Octagon House, and the Marine Exchange Lookout Station at Land's End are the only three remaining octagon houses in the city.

Haunting and folklore 
The house is purportedly haunted by a pacing ghost that appears annually on November 24. After the 20th step sounds the ghost screams and makes a falling body sound.

See also
 List of San Francisco Designated Landmarks
National Register of Historic Places listings in San Francisco
Nathanial Brittan Party House

References

External links
 The National Society of the Colonial Dames of America.org: Octagon House, 1861 
LOC.gov: HABS−Historic American Buildings Survey of the McElroy Octagon House, homepage
LOC.gov: HABS vintage McElroy Octagon House photographs, online gallery

Houses in San Francisco
Octagon houses in California
Historic house museums in California
Museums in San Francisco
National Register of Historic Places in San Francisco
San Francisco Designated Landmarks
National Society of the Colonial Dames of America
Historic American Buildings Survey in California
1861 establishments in California
1860s architecture in the United States
Victorian architecture in California
California Historical Landmarks
Reportedly haunted locations in San Francisco
Houses on the National Register of Historic Places in San Francisco